The Christian Topography is a 6th-century work, one of the earliest essays in scientific geography written by a Christian author. It originally consisted of five books written by Cosmas Indicopleustes and expanded to ten and eventually to twelve books at around 550 AD.

Cosmology 
Cosmas Indicopleustes, the author of the Christian Topography, put forward the idea that the world is flat. Originally written in Greek with illustrations and maps, his view of the flatness of the world may have been influenced by some Jewish and Eastern contemporaries. While most of the Christians of the same period maintained that the Earth was a sphere, the work advances the idea that the world is flat, and that the heavens form the shape of a box with a curved lid, and especially attacks the idea that the heavens were spherical and in motion, now known as the geocentric model of the universe.  The author cites passages of scripture which he interprets originally in order to support his thesis, and attempts to argue down the idea of a spherical earth by stigmatizing it as "pagan".  An early surviving reference to the work is by Patriarch Photios I of Constantinople in the 9th century AD.  Photius condemns the style and syntax of the text as well as the honesty of the author.  More recent authors tend to agree with Photius on the stylistic points, but to find the work generally reliable for geographical and historical references.  Edward Gibbon, for example, said "the nonsense of the Monk was, nevertheless, mingled with the practical knowledge of the traveller" and used it in writing The History of the Decline and Fall of the Roman Empire.

The Topography is often erroneously cited as evidence that Christianity introduced the idea of the flat-earth into the world, and brought in the age of ignorance.  The latter pages of his work are devoted to rebutting the criticism of his fellow monks.  He repeatedly denounces "those reprobate Christians who, ..., prefer, through their perverse folly or downright wickedness, to adopt the miserable Pagan belief that earth and heaven are spherical, and that there are Antipodes on whom the rain must fall up."  Raymond Beazley, in the first volume of The Dawn of Modern Geography (1897), said

Geography 

Besides the cosmological elements of the book, Christian Topography provides insight into the geographical knowledge of Byzantium, it is also the only Greek work with both text and illustrations surviving from the 6th century. "Indicopleustes" means "The one who has sailed to India". While it is known from classical literature that there had been trade between the Roman Empire and India, Cosmas was one of the individuals who had actually made the journey. Indeed, we learn from his book that he had travelled over much of the Red Sea coast, and as far as modern Sri Lanka. He described and sketched some of what he saw in his Topography. Some of these have been copied into the existing manuscripts.

When not expounding his cosmology, Cosmas proves to be an interesting and reliable guide, providing a window into a world that has since disappeared.  He happened to be in Ethiopia when the King of Axum was preparing a 522 or 525 AD military expedition to attack Jewish Arabs in Yemen.  He recorded now-vanished inscriptions such as the Monumentum Adulitanum (which he mistakenly attributed to Ptolemy III Euergetes).

Manuscripts
Three nearly complete manuscripts are known to exist. The earliest and best is from the 9th century, and is in the Vatican Library.  This text has only ten books.  Two closely related manuscripts of the 11th century, one from the Saint Catherine's Monastery and the other probably originally from the Iviron monastery of Mount Athos, contain twelve books and comment on the prophets in the same order that Theodore of Mopsuestia preferred rather than in Septuagint order as in the copy from the Vatican Library. The eleventh and twelfth books may originally have been parts of other works by the same author.  Portions of book five appear more frequently as a marginal commentary upon the psalms, and it is the name given to the author in these commentaries that is now used.

Influence
David C. Lindberg asserts: "Cosmas was not particularly influential in Byzantium, but he is important for us because he has been commonly used to buttress the claim that all (or most) medieval people believed they lived on a flat earth. This claim...is totally false. Cosmas is, in fact, the only medieval European known to have defended a flat earth cosmology, whereas it is safe to assume that all educated Western Europeans (and almost one hundred percent of educated Byzantines), as well as sailors and travellers, believed in the earth's sphericity."

References
This article uses text taken from the Preface to the Online English translation of the Christian Topography, which is in the public domain.

External links
 The Christian Topography by Cosmas Indicopleustes (trans. J. W. McCrindle)
  Original Greek text
Scan of the entire Codex Vat.gr.699 on Biblioteca Apostolica Vaticana website

6th-century books
Byzantine literature
Flat Earth
Historical geography